CVT may refer to:

Science and technology
 Capacitor voltage transformer, an electrical transformer commonly used in high-voltage transmission line applications
 Centroidal Voronoi tessellation, a geometric object
 Chemical vapor transport, a method for growing crystals
 Constant voltage transformer, a type of saturating transformer as an alternating current voltage stabilizer
 Coordinated Video Timings, specified by VESA
 Cytoplasm-to-vacuole targeting, a autophagy-related pathway in yeast
 Compound Value Type, a type within Freebase which is used to represent data where each entry consists of multiple fields
 Cardiovascular thoracic surgery (see cardiothoracic surgery), a field of medicine involved in surgical treatment of diseases affecting organs inside the thorax (the chest)—generally treatment of conditions of the heart (heart disease) and lungs (lung disease)
 Cerebral venous thrombosis or cerebral venous sinus thrombosis.
 Drill chucks.

Organizations
 Center for Victims of Torture, a non-profit organisation that provides counseling and social services to victims of politically motivated torture.
 Centro di Volo a Vela del Politecnico di Torino, the gliding section of the Turin Polytechnic; see List of gliders
 Creative Vision Technologies, see Northgate Computers

Transportation and military
 Continuously variable transmission, a vehicle transmission providing an infinite number of possible gear ratios
 Coventry Airport (IATA airport code), United Kingdom
 Peran (ICAO airline designator), Kazakhstan; see Airline codes-P
 Aircraft Carrier, Training (former hull classification symbol), a training aircraft carrier in the United States Navy

Other uses
 Cape Verde Time, a time zone used in Cape Verde
 Certified Veterinary Technician
 Cognitive valence theory, a theoretical framework that describes and explains the process of intimacy exchange within a dyad relationship
 Complete Vocal Technique, a singing method developed by Cathrine Sadolin